Nguyễn Thanh Hải (born 26 November 1988) is a Vietnamese footballer who plays as an attacking midfielder for V.League 2 club Cần Thơ.

External links

References 

1988 births
Living people
Vietnamese footballers
Association football midfielders
V.League 1 players
SHB Da Nang FC players